RIFA may refer to:
 Red imported fire ant
 RIFA AB, defunct Swedish electronics manufacturer